Lamma Channel may refer to:

East Lamma Channel, a waterway on the east of Lamma Island in Hong Kong
West Lamma Channel, a waterway on the west of Lamma Island in Hong Kong